The North South Line (NS Line) is a streetcar service of the Portland Streetcar system in Portland, Oregon, United States. The line connects Portland's Northwest District, Pearl District, downtown, Portland State University (PSU), and South Waterfront. It runs every day of the week between 15 and 18 hours per day and operates on headways of 15 to 20 minutes.

The restoration of streetcar service, which last operated in Portland in 1950, began with the efforts of a citizen advisory committee in 1990. After nearly a decade of planning, construction of the Central City Streetcar project began in 1999. With the opening of its first  segment on July 20, 2001, it became the inaugural line of the Portland Streetcar system and the first second-generation streetcar service in the United States with its use of modern vehicles. The line has since been extended to RiverPlace and the South Waterfront. Having previously had no distinct route name, it was designated the North South Line in September 2012, when the system opened its second service, the Central Loop Line, which was later re-branded as the A and B Loop.

History

Early planning

Planning for the restoration of streetcar services in downtown Portland, which had ceased operating in 1950, was considered as early as the 1970s, when businessman and philanthropist Bill Naito led an effort to convince downtown property owners to help build a vintage trolley line. In response to recommendations to develop a streetcar network by Portland's 1988 Central City Plan, a citizen-led advisory committee was established in 1990 that would convince the city to the conduct a feasibility study. Early plans envisioned three lines, with the first running up from John's Landing near the South Waterfront through downtown Portland to Northwest 23rd Avenue in the Northwest District. This proposed line, initially referred to as "Central City Trolley", was predicted to run replicas of cars that once served Council Crest. Project supporters and planners later renamed it the "Central City Streetcar", after opting instead to employ modern, low-floor trams in the hopes that it would be seen as a transit system rather than a tourist attraction.

Several alternative routes were considered in downtown, including the Portland Transit Mall on 5th and 6th avenues, as well as Park and 9th avenues. Both routes were rejected by nearby neighborhood associations. In January 1994, the Portland City Council adopted a route between Legacy Good Samaritan Medical Center on Northwest 23rd Avenue and PSU via 10th and 11th avenues, and the following year, called for bids to design, build, and operate the service. The nonprofit Portland Streetcar, Inc., which consisted of leaders from the city's businesses and public institutions, was the only firm to respond to the bid request.

Funding and construction

The city council authorized the streetcar project in July 1997. The cost of the project amounted to $56.9 million (equivalent to $ in  dollars), with the city covering the largest share. City parking bonds provided most of the city's contribution at $28.6 million. In September 1998, the city council created a local improvement district to collect funding from properties situated within two blocks of the streetcar alignment, providing $9.6 million. The Portland Development Commission redistributed $7.5 million in tax increment funds from the South Park Blocks urban renewal area that had been earmarked for TriMet's cancelled South/North Corridor project; this was used to extend the streetcar route through the PSU campus to Southwest 5th Avenue. Only $5 million came from the Federal Transit Administration for construction, reallocated from TriMet to the city in exchange for a system giving TriMet buses transit signal priority. Procurement and installation of tracks and wiring and the construction of a maintenance barn beneath the Fremont Bridge were estimated at $28.2 million and $4 million, respectively. In 1999, Czech manufacturer Škoda was selected to provide the line's first five streetcars, valued at $12 million. The streetcar order was expanded to seven in 2001 to provide enough cars for a planned extension of the line from PSU to RiverPlace.

Construction of the Central City Streetcar began on April 5, 1999, marked by a groundbreaking ceremony. Crews from Stacy and Witbeck started utilities relocation work along Northwest Lovejoy Street that same day; relocation work on 10th and 11th avenues followed in June. Track-laying occurred one week after the start of roadway demolition and progressed southward through downtown. Workers reached the PSU campus in June 2000 by the time university officials resolved the alignment of the tracks, placing the northbound segment diagonally though the newly built Urban Plaza and the southbound segment through the northern end of the campus. The  maintenance barn that would house the streetcars was 90 percent complete by August. Line testing commenced in January 2001 using one of two replica-vintage trolleys that would be transferred from TriMet's Portland Vintage Trolley for planned weekend use on the streetcar line. The project's completion, initially targeted for February, was pushed back to May due to delays in pole and power line installation. The delivery of the first streetcar, which had been  expected in late February, was also delayed by the acquisition of a line-of-credit deal, established as a form of insurance in the event the cars did not work out. The first car finally arrived in April.

Opening and later extensions

The first  of the Central City Streetcar, later renamed to "Portland Streetcar", opened on July 20, 2001, from Northwest 23rd Avenue to PSU. The line was notably the first "second-generation streetcar" system in the United States and Portland's first new streetcar service in fifty years. Opening day celebrations were held at various points along the line, and free rides were offered for three days. Four streetcars initially operated on weekdays, while three streetcars and one vintage trolley ran on weekends. The Portland Streetcar had recorded 6,000 to 8,000 daily riders by September 2001, exceeding 1996 projections of between 2,700 and 4,700 riders per day.

In 2004, construction began on a  extension south from PSU to RiverPlace. It cost $16 million and opened on March 11, 2005. This segment also includes the steepest grade on the system, 8.75% in the block of Southwest Harrison Street between 1st and 2nd avenues. It was initially a bidirectional single track, operating on a right-of-way acquired from the Willamette Shore Trolley, a heritage streetcar that continues to operate between Portland and Lake Oswego. On August 17, 2007, an extension of the line south of Gibbs Street to Southwest Lowell and Bond opened to better serve the South Waterfront district. This  extension is a 10-block loop, from Southwest Moody and Gibbs proceeding south on Moody Avenue, east on Lowell Street and north on Bond Avenue to OHSU Plaza at Gibbs. This final extension of the line cost $14.45 million.

On November 3, 2011, the streetcar line began using new double-track on a realigned section of Moody Avenue, which was built as part of the $66 million Moody multimodal project. Two stops—OHSU Plaza and Southwest Moody & Gibbs—were built directly adjacent to the entrance to the Portland Aerial Tram, linking the lower campus of Oregon Health & Science University (OHSU) to its campus atop Marquam Hill. These stations received a connection to the Lair Hill neighborhood that was otherwise cut off by Interstate 5 (I-5) with the opening of the Gibbs Street Pedestrian Bridge on July 14, 2012. Until 2012, the north–south streetcar line had no route name, being referred to only as the Portland Streetcar line, because it was the only line in the system. However, with the opening of the system's second line on September 22, 2012, the original line was designated the North South Line (abbreviated as NS Line) to distinguish it from the newly built Central Loop line (CL Line), later renamed A and B Loop.

Service

The NS Line runs for approximately 18 hours per day on weekdays, 16 hours on Saturdays, and 15 hours on Sundays. During weekdays, NS Line trains begin service at 5:45 am heading southbound from Northwest 23rd & Marshall station; the first northbound train departs Southwest Lowell & Bond station at around 6:27 am. Service begins later on weekends at approximately 7:24 am. End-to-end travel takes approximately 35 minutes. Headways run from as short as fifteen minutes between 10:00 am and 7:00 pm on weekdays and Saturdays to a maximum of 20 minutes for all other times. The final southbound train to run the full length of the line on weekdays departs from the northern end at 10:30 pm while the final northbound train departs the southern end at 11:15 pm. The last five trains on weekdays and Saturdays travel southbound from Northwest 23rd & Marshall and terminate at Northwest 18th & Lovejoy, with the last train arriving at 11:53 pm. On Sundays, service ceases earlier at 11:07 pm.

The NS Line is the busiest streetcar route, averaging 8,751 riders on weekdays in September 2018, which is slightly higher than the 8,307 recorded for the same month in 2017. The Portland Streetcar achieved a new system-wide record for average weekday ridership in April 2018, with the NS Line carrying 9,226 passengers.

Route

Its northern terminus is Northwest 23rd & Marshall station in the Northwest District, which is situated on a turning loop near the intersection of Northwest 23rd Avenue and Northwest Marshall Street. Between Northwest 23rd and 10th avenues, the streetcar alignment follows an east–west direction and is split between Northwest Northrup and Lovejoy streets, where cars travel northbound and southbound, respectively. On Northwest 15th and 16th avenues, the line runs beneath Interstate 405 (I-405), passing the system's maintenance barn. It turns south on Northwest 10th and 11th avenues in the Pearl District and is joined by cars serving the Loop Service. On this segment, trains travel northbound on 10th Avenue and southbound on 11th Avenue, passing The Armory and Powell's City of Books. The line enters Southwest Portland and upon traversing West Burnside Street. It crosses the Blue Line and Red Line tracks of MAX Light Rail on Southwest Morrison and Yamhill streets. Just north of the PSU campus, the southbound alignment turns east onto Southwest Market Street and south onto Southwest 5th Avenue, while the northbound segment turns east onto Southwest Mill Street and travels diagonally through PSU's Urban Plaza.

The section along the latter street was also single-track originally, until being doubled in 2014. The line travels for one block along 4th before turning onto Southwest Harrison Street. The line enters RiverPlace via Southwest River Parkway where it turns south onto Southwest Moody Avenue, running beneath the I-5 and I-405 interchange. After passing the OHSU Robertson Life Sciences Building, it crosses the MAX Orange Line tracks, which are joined by the Loop Service alignment for the Tilikum Crossing. The NS Line continues southward, traveling under the Ross Island Bridge as its northbound tracks split eastward onto Southwest Bond Avenue between the lower terminal of the Portland Aerial Tram and the OHSU Center for Health & Healing. The tracks proceed southward and join at the Southwest Lowell Street turning loop, which is occupied by the line's southern terminus, Southwest Lowell & Bond station.

Stations

The NS Line serves 39 stations, of which 24 are shared with the Loop Service. Each platform is equipped with a ticket vending machine, real-time display system, and line information signs. All stations are accessible to users with limited mobility. Connections to MAX Light Rail are available at five stops across the line and a connection to the Portland Aerial Tram, which links the South Waterfront and Marquam Hill campuses of OHSU, can be made at the Southwest Moody & Gibbs and OHSU Plaza stations.

In February 2016, four stations—Northwest 10th & Everett, Northwest 11th & Everett, Southwest 10th & Stark, and Southwest 1st & Harrison—were temporarily closed as part of a trial run to speed up travel times, particularly at stops that were prone to vehicular collisions. The following month, Portland Streetcar made the closures permanent, having reduced travel time through downtown by two minutes. Some decommissioned platforms were later converted into Biketown stations.

Former Vintage Trolley service

From 2001 to 2005, Portland Vintage Trolley service operated on the NS Line on most weekends. Of four replica 1904 Brill streetcars owned by TriMet and in use on the MAX Light Rail system between 1991 and 2014, two were transferred to the city for use on the Portland Streetcar line. The service operated on Saturdays and Sundays, using one car at a time, from approximately 10:00 am to 6:00 pm, on regularly scheduled trips that otherwise would be operated by a modern Škoda car.  They were non-wheelchair accessible.

Vintage Trolley service on the Portland Streetcar was temporarily suspended near the end of November 2005, in part due to maintenance problems with the two cars, and because the opening of the extension from PSU to RiverPlace in March 2005 caused operations difficulties with the faux-vintage trolley cars. The Vintage Trolley service, which resumed in May 2005 after a five-month suspension for repair work on the two cars, continued to end at PSU, not serving the section to RiverPlace. The late-2005 suspension eventually became permanent; the two Vintage Trolley cars were transferred back to TriMet, which transferred them over to the Willamette Shore Trolley in 2013.

Note

References

External links

 

2001 establishments in Oregon
Passenger rail transportation in Oregon
Railway lines opened in 2001
Streetcars in Oregon
Transportation in Portland, Oregon
TriMet